Brian James Patrick Doyle was an American writer. He was a recipient of the American Academy of Arts and Letters Award in Literature and three Pushcart Prizes.

He lived with his wife and three children in Portland, Oregon. In May 2017, he died at the age of 60 due to a brain tumour.

Early life and career 
He was born in 1956 in New York City to an Irish Catholic family. He studied at the University of Notre Dame, where he graduated with a major in English in 1978.

Doyle was also an editor of Portland Magazine.

Doyle's essays and poems have appeared in magazines and journals such as The Atlantic Monthly, Harper's, The American Scholar, Orion, Commonweal, and The Georgia Review and in newspapers such as The Times of London, The Sydney Morning Herald, The Kansas City Star, The San Francisco Chronicle, The Ottawa Citizen, and Newsday. He was a book reviewer for The Oregonian and a contributing essayist to both Eureka Street magazine and The Age newspaper in Melbourne, Australia.

Bibliography
 Two Voices: A Father and Son Discuss Family and Faith (1996)
The Wet Engine (2005)
 The Grail ​(2006)
 Mink River (2010)
The Thorny Grace of It: And Other Essays for Imperfect Catholics (2013)
 A Book of Uncommon Prayer  (2014) 
 Martin Marten (2015)
 How the Light Gets In: and other Headlong Epiphanies (2015)
 Chicago (2016)
 The Adventures of John Carson in Several Quarters of the World: A Novel of Robert Louis Stevenson (2017)
 One Long River of Song: Notes on Wonder and the Spiritual and Nonspiritual Alike (2019).

References 

1956 births
2017 deaths
20th-century American novelists
21st-century American novelists
American people of Irish descent
Notre Dame College of Arts and Letters alumni
American magazine editors
Writers from New York City